Mary Margaret Bell (later Ryan and Gibson, January 26, 1917 – May 10, 1996) was a Canadian athlete who competed in the 1936 Summer Olympics.  She was born in Seven Persons, Alberta.

At the 1934 Empire Games she won the bronze medal in the high jump competition and later that year the silver medal at the 1934 Women's World Games. In 1936 she finished ninth in the Olympic high jump event.  She finished fourth in the high jump contest at the 1938 Empire Games. She died in 1996, aged 79.

References

 sports-reference.com

1917 births
1996 deaths
Athletes from Vancouver
Canadian female high jumpers
Olympic track and field athletes of Canada
Athletes (track and field) at the 1936 Summer Olympics
Athletes (track and field) at the 1934 British Empire Games
Athletes (track and field) at the 1938 British Empire Games
Commonwealth Games bronze medallists for Canada
Commonwealth Games medallists in athletics
Women's World Games medalists
Medallists at the 1934 British Empire Games